Papilio nubilus is a rare species of swallowtail butterfly from the genus Papilio that can be found in Borneo.

Previously listed as a distinct species ( D'Abrera 1982, Munroe 1961), but now regarded (by Collins & Morris 1985, Tsukada & Nishiyama 1982: 307) as an interspecific hybrid between Papilio nephelus and Papilio polytes.

Subspecies
Papilio nubilus nubilus (northern Borneo)
Papilio nubilus musianus Rothschild, 1899 (Upper Palembang district)

Taxonomy
Papilio nubilus is a member of the helenus species-group. Other members of this clade are
Papilio helenus Linnaeus, 1758 
Papilio iswara White, 1842
Papilio iswaroides Fruhstorfer, 1898
Papilio nephelus Boisduval, 1836
Papilio nubilus Staudinger, 1895
Papilio sataspes C. & R. Felder, 1865

References

External links
Global Butterfly Information System Images

nubilus
Butterflies described in 1895
Butterflies of Borneo